Elder William M. Smoot William M. Smoot (about 1848-1938) was a resident of Occoquan, Virginia and for many years was a leading Predestinarian Old School Primitive Baptist preacher in Prince William County. He was the preacher of Occoquan (also known as Bacon Race to those outside the membership of those associated with Elder Smoot) and Quantico Baptist churches from 1888 to 1938. A GOD-called preacher of the original faith and order of the Baptists in America, Elder Smoot, whose followers were known locally as "Smootites," engaged in a heated rivalry over doctrine and practice as set forth in the Bible(KJV) with the reverend Thomas D.D. Clark, whose Union Baptist Church was located across the road from the Quantico Baptist Church in the village of Independent Hill.

Elder Smoot was a prolific writer of religious tracts setting forth the true order of predestination, election, total depravity of all humans in their natural state, with GOD's elect children being called in the Spiritual birth while they lived upon this earth, and their sanctification and preservation are eternal; including several books and pamphlets, and a monthly newsletter he printed himself on a press set up in his home in Occoquan. This newsletter, "The Sectarian" devoted to the Cause of the Anti-Means, Old School, Predestinarian, or Bible Baptists" appeared in monthly installments from 1890 until Elder Smoot's death in 1938. In 1904 Elder Smoot also published a collection of 698 hymns, called "The Sectarian Hymnal".

Elder Smoot died at his home in 1938 at the age of 90. He was found on his front porch seated in a chair with his Bible in his hand and glasses still on his nose.

References 

CONTEST OF 1886---1889 BY ELDER WILLIAM MIDDLETON SMOOT

1848 births
1938 deaths
19th-century Baptist ministers from the United States